This is the 25th studio album by Peter Hammill, released on his Fie! label in 1998. There is a large variety in the compositions, ranging from the minimalism of the final song, "The Light Continent", to the rough, almost Nadir-like sound of "Always is Next", the complex "Unrehearsed" and the ballad "Since the Kids". Peter Hammill performed the song "Unrehearsed" live many times. "Nightman" can be heard on the live-album Veracious (2006).

Production and instrumentation 
The album was recorded, mixed and mastered at Peter Hammill's own studio, Terra Incognita in Bath, between January and July 1998. All instruments were played and all voices sung by Hammill, except for violin and viola by Stuart Gordon, saxophones and flute by David Jackson, and drums and percussion by Manny Elias. Hammill himself regards the album as "not in any sense a 'band' disc", and considers "the unifying factors [to be] song and voice rather than instrumentation". The songs are interspersed with small instrumental fragments (according to Hammill, "their presence is essential in order to glue the whole thing together").

Cover 
The cover shows a tree stump and a collection of objects, signifying the passing of time. There is a tachograph disc, ripped out of the machine at high speed on one of the tours, and a picture of a wristwatch that used to belong to Hammill's father. The design was done by RidArt (Paul Ridout).

Track listing
All songs written by Peter Hammill.
"Frozen in Place (fragment)" – 0:46
"Unrehearsed" – 7:05
"Stupid" – 4:26
"Since the Kids" – 5:56
"Nightman" – 6:17
"Fallen (the City of Night)" – 5:37
"Unready (fragment)" – 0:42
"Always is Next" – 3:58
"Unsteady (fragment)" – 0:58
"The Light Continent" – 14:02

Personnel
All instruments and voices by Peter Hammill except:
Manny Elias – drums & percussion (2, 3, 6, 8)
Stuart Gordon – violin & viola (2, 5, 6, 7, 8, 9, 10)
David Jackson – saxophones & flute (2, 3, 5, 8, 10)

Technical
Peter Hammill - recording engineer, mixing (Terra Incognita, Bath)
Paul Ridout - design & art direction

Notes

External links
SofaSound newsletter by Peter Hammill announcing and describing the album

Peter Hammill albums
1998 albums